Drip Harder is a collaborative mixtape by American rappers Lil Baby and Gunna. It was released on October 5, 2018, by YSL Records, Quality Control Music, Motown and Capitol Records. The mixtape features guest appearances from Lil Durk, Nav, Young Thug, and Drake. It includes production from Turbo, Wheezy, and Tay Keith, among others. The name Drip Harder is taken from Gunna's Drip Season series of mixtapes and from Lil Baby's Harder series of mixtapes.

Promotion
The lead single, "Drip Too Hard", was released as a single on September 12, 2018 for streaming and digital download. It peaked at number four on the US Billboard Hot 100 becoming the highest-charting song for Gunna and second highest-charting song for Lil Baby. The second single, "Close Friends" by Lil Baby, released as a single on February 2, 2019, peaked at number 28 on the Hot 100, becoming one of Lil Baby's best performing singles.

Critical reception

Drip Harder received positive reviews from critics. At Metacritic, which assigns a normalized rating out of 100 to reviews from mainstream publications, the album received an average score of 76, based on 4 reviews, indicating "generally favorable reviews". Alphonse Pierre of Pitchfork praised the mixtape for the artists' chemistry, writing that "Lil Baby and Gunna’s chemistry is a refreshing splash in an Atlanta hip-hop scene that has felt stagnant. It’s the duo establishing themselves, knowing they have some limitations, but capitalizing on what they do well. And even if they break up over some pettiness like Rich Gang, Drip Harder will be remembered as a moment that let hip-hop know it had two new superstars." However, criticism was directed towards the production by main producer Turbo, whose "monotonous drums patterns grow tiresome. A few of his beats blend into one another, and he’s just not versatile enough to carry a project on his back." Online hip hop publication HotNewHipHop commented: "As a groupable entity, Lil Baby & Gunna have done enough to earn themselves a hierarchical position in the pecking order. But more importantly, Drip Harder, a presumed team-building exercise, has ironically given rise to an even greater sense of autonomy within the group, for Lil Baby in particular."

Clayton Tomlinson of Exclaim! concluded the mixtape is "a good effort from these two but could've been tighter. It's best when Lil Baby raps about his emotions, where the two once were and when Gunna brags about how far they've come since. But it's clear, they've still got farther to go." For Consequence of Sound, Tommy Monroe complimented the stylistic production and the chemistry between the artists: "On Drip Harder, Lil Baby and Gunna make it hard to determine who shines brightest because both deliver their best most of the time. They aren’t just a duo, but a wave, a style, and a vibe." However, Monroe added "the contrasting relationship between the beat and the YSL artist’s flow makes the song sound longer than it is and consequently drag."

In light of the mixtape's release, Pitchfork and Stereogum dubbed Lil Baby and Gunna "the best rap duo in years". Comparing the duo to Young Thug and Rich Homie Quan, Tom Breihan of Stereogum wrote: "Once again, we’ve got a pairing of two young Atlanta rappers, both of whom are on a serious career upswing. Baby and Gunna are both melodic rappers, and they’re both studio rats, guys who will crank out one song after another in quick succession. They’ve got chemistry, and you can hear the exhilaration in both of their voices when they rap together. They’ve got a producer who understands them. They’ve got energy working for them, like all the planets are just now aligning in their favor."

Commercial performance
Drip Harder debuted at number four on the US Billboard 200 chart, earning 130,000 album-equivalent units (including 9,000 copies in pure album sales) in its first week. This is Lil Baby's second US top-ten debut and the first for Gunna. The album also accumulated a total of 164.63 million on-demand audio streams for the album’s tracks, making it the most-streamed album of the week. In its second week, the album remained at number four on the chart, earning an additional 71,000 album-equivalent units that week. In its third week, the album dropped to number six on the chart, earning 56,000 album-equivalent units that week. In its fourth week, the album remained at number six on the chart, earning an additional 49,000 album-equivalent units, bringing its four-week total to 306,000 album-equivalent units. On September 27, 2019, the album was certified platinum by the Recording Industry Association of America (RIAA) for combined sales and album-equivalent units of over a million units in the United States.

Track listing
Credits adapted from Tidal and BMI.

Notes
  signifies an uncredited co-producer.
 "Off White Vlone" is stylized as "Off White VLONE".

Personnel
Credits adapted from Tidal.

Instrumentation
 Ghetto Guitar - guitar 
 Michael Ferguson - guitar 
 Ramiro Morales - guitar 

Technical
 Fabian Marasciullo – mixing 
 Turbo – engineer , mixing 
 Michael "MikFly" Dottin – mixing 
 McCoy Socalgargoyle – mixing assistance 
 Colin Leonard – mastering 
 Quay Global – engineer

Charts

Weekly charts

Year-end charts

Decade-end charts

Certifications

References

2018 mixtape albums
Gunna (rapper) albums
Lil Baby albums
Quality Control Music albums
Motown albums
Capitol Records albums
Albums produced by Frank Dukes
Albums produced by Tay Keith